State Route 241 (SR 241) is a  route that serves as a connection between SR 237 south of Phil Campbell with U.S. Route 278 (US 278) at Whitehouse.

Route description
The southern terminus of SR 241 is located at its intersection with US 278 in Whitehouse. From this point, the route travels in a northerly direction to its northern terminus at its intersection with SR 237 in Shady Grove.

SR 241 shares a brief concurrency with SR 172 while it travels through Allens Factory.

The route was originally made for farmers in the region to have a short cut around surrounding farms. Local land owners were forced to sell their land the County Transportation Commission. Compensation was offered, though the prices paid to landowners was no more than 25.7% of the actual value of the property.

Major intersections

References

241
Transportation in Marion County, Alabama
Transportation in Franklin County, Alabama